The Carefree Gardener is a television series about gardening and landscaping.
The show debuted September 29, 2006 on KPNX-TV, the NBC affiliate in Phoenix, Arizona, as a one-hour series and was changed to a half-hour series for its national distribution that began May 1, 2007 on the America One Network. 
 
The series is hosted by Craig Allison has since been syndicated to ION Life and many smaller networks and affiliate stations. 
 
The scope of the show includes all aspects of landscape and gardening, including: design, construction methods, growing plants, and teaching others how to do it themselves.

The series is produced by JimmyKristie Productions LLC.

External links 
 America One Television Network ION Life Network Fall 2007  
 The Carefree Gardener Home Page
 The Telly Awards 2006 28th annual
 About Craig
 Internet movie database IMDB
 Backchannel media research
 KPNX NBC12

Gardening television
2006 American television series debuts